Camden Town Library, also referred to as Camden Town Public Library, is a public library in the London Borough of Camden, England. It is located on the ground floor of Crowndale Centre in Camden Town.

References

External links 
 Official website

Libraries in the London Borough of Camden
Public libraries in London